Saldidae, also known as shore bugs, are a family of insects in the order Hemiptera (true bugs). They are oval-shaped and measure  when mature. Typically they are found near shorelines or the marginal growths near freshwater bodies, estuaries, and sea coasts. They can flee by leaping or taking flight. There are about 350 recognized species with the majority from the Nearctic and Palearctic. Many species are found in the intertidal zone and both adults and nymphs of some species like Saldula pallipes can tolerate submergence at high-tide. Saldidae are predators and scavengers. They pass the winter through egg or adult diapause.

Genera
These 39 genera belong to the family Saldidae:

 Aoteasalda Larivière & Larochelle, 2016
 Calacanthia Reuter, 1891
 Capitonisalda J.Polhemus, 1981
 Capitonisaldoida J.Polhemus & D.Polhemus, 1991
 Chartosaldoida Cobben, 1987
 Chartoscirta Stal, 1868
 Chiloxanthus Reuter, 1891
 Enalosalda Polhemus & Evans, 1969
 Halosalda Reuter, 1912
 Ioscytus Reuter, 1912
 Kiwisaldula Larivière & Larochelle, 2016
 Lampracanthia Reuter, 1912
 Macrosaldula Leston & Southwood, 1964
 Mascarenisalda J.Polhemus & D.Polhemus, 1991
 Micracanthia Reuter, 1912
 Oiosalda Drake & Hoberlandt, 1952
 Orthophrys Horvath, 1911
 Orthosaldula Gapud, 1986
 Pentacora Reuter, 1912
 Propentacora J.Polhemus, 1985
 Pseudosaldula Cobben, 1961
 Rupisalda J.Polhemus, 1985
 Salda Fabricius, 1803
 Saldoida Osborn, 1901
 Saldula Van Duzee, 1914
 Salduncula Brown, 1954
 Sinosalda Vinokurov, 2004
 Teloleuca Reuter, 1912
 Zemacrosaldula Larivière & Larochelle, 2015
 † Baissotea Ryzhkova, 2015
 † Brevrimatus Zhang, Yao & Ren, 2011
 † Helenasaldula Cobben, 1976
 † Luculentsalda Zhang, Yao & Ren, 2013
 † Mongolocoris Ryzhkova, 2012
 † Oligosaldina Statz, 1950
 † Paralosalda Polhemus & Evans, 1969
 † Saldonia Popov, 1973
 † Ulanocoris Ryzhkova, 2012
 † Venustsalda Zhang, Song, Yao & Ren, 2012

References

External links 
 Family Saldidae - Shore Bugs, Bug Guide.
 Saldidae, Cornell University Entomology.

 
Heteroptera families
Leptopodomorpha